Sergio Caputo (born August 31, 1954, in Rome) is an Italian singer, writer, composer, and guitarist.

Caputo's first LP was released in 1983. It presented a style that combined jazz and Latin-jazz pop.

Over his recording career he produced 14 albums where he continued his experimentation of musical and lyrical expression, as both an author and producer as well as guitarist and performer.

He also collaborated with many renewed musicians, including Lester Bowie, Tony Scott, Mel Collins (King Crimson), Tony Bowers (Simply Red), Enrico Rava and Danilo Rea.

In 2003, he released "That Kind of Thing", a guitar-based Smooth Jazz album recorded in California.

In 2008, he published his first book "Disperatamente, e in ritardo cane" (Desperately, and dog-late) - Mondadori.  The book is about a faded Italian pop star - living in California - who goes back to Italy every now and then for a tour. Until this one time he loses his American passport and gets stuck in his old wild life.

In 2009, he released, on his new label Alcatraz Moon, the live album "La notte è un pazzo con le mêches", with his band, the Sergio Caputo Quintet experience.

In 2013, he released the 30º anniversary remake of his first album - Un Sabato Italiano 30 - which redefines Sergio Caputo's style back to his jazzy roots.  He also writes a "reality" book titled "Un Sabato Italiano Memories" (Mondadori) about the years when he - a young art director in a big advertising agency - was torn between his day job and his passion for music.

In 2015, he released his first work of brand new songs in many years, Pop Jazz and Love.  The album is about "happy love" and is entirely in English but for one song.  The style is jazz with a twist of Latino.

In 2017, he starts a collaboration with Francesco Baccini - another Italian famous songwriter - and together they tour and release the single "Non Fidarti di Me" (Do Not Trust Me).  An entire album of brand new songs by both Caputo and Baccini is expected before the end of the year

Discography

Album 
 1981 - Sergio Caputo (Q Disc) (Dischi Ricordi, EPL 5002)
 1983 - Un sabato italiano (CGD)
 1984 - Italiani mambo (CGD)
 1985 - No smoking (CGD)
 1986 - Effetti personali (CGD)
 1987 - Ne approfitto per fare un po' di musica (live) (CGD)
 1988 - Storie di whisky andati (CGD)
 1989 - Lontano che vai (CGD)
 1990 - Sogno erotico sbagliato (Fonit Cetra)
 1993 - Egomusicocefalo (CGD)
 1996 - I Love Jazz
 1998 - Serenadas
 2003 - That kind of thing
 2006 - A tu per tu
 2009 - La notte è un pazzo con le mèches LIVE (Alcatraz Moon)

Official compilation 
 1990 - Swing & soda: il meglio di Sergio Caputo
 1998 - Cocktail

Cover
 2009 - Piji e Masquèra strapazzano Caputo (ALCATRAZ MOON)

Single  
 1978 - Libertà dove sei / Giorno di festa (IT, ZBT 7098)
 1983 - Un sabato italiano / Spicchio di luna (CGD)
 1983 - Bimba se sapessi / Mercy bocù (CGD)
 1985 - L'astronave che arriva / Scubidù  (maxi single) (CGD)
 1987 - Il Garibaldi innamorato / Flamenco amorespia (CGD)
 1989 - Rifarsi una vita / Anche i detective piangono (CGD)
 2009 - On a Lonely Night'' (ALCATRAZ MOON)

External links

Official web site
MySpace
Facebook

Living people
Italian guitarists
Italian male singers
1954 births
Italian jazz singers
Italian jazz guitarists
Italian male guitarists
Male jazz musicians